Geodin is an antibiotic against Gram-positive bacteria with the molecular formula C17H8CL2O7. Geodin is produced by the fungus Aspergillus terreus.

References

Further reading 

 
 

Antibiotics
Chloroarenes
Methyl esters
Spiro compounds
Benzofurans